Stephanie Niemer (born September 3, 1989) is a female American volleyballer, playing as an Outside Hitter.

Career
After three years in Puerto Rico, Stefani Niemer in 2014 traveled for first time in Europe, signing in French ASPTT Mulhouse. In 2015–16 season she played for Azeryol Baku and she was voted 2015–16 Azerbaijan Volleyball Super League "Best Outside Hitter". In 2016 she was selected to the Philippine Super Liga All-Stars team who competed at the 2016 FIVB Volleyball Women's Club World Championship.

In the summer of 2017 Stephanie Niemer traveled for a second time in Europe, signing with Greek powerhouse Olympiacos Piraeus, who were competing in the Hellenic Women’s Volleyball League and the CEV Women's Challenge Cup. In Greece, Niemer stood out for her highly efficient service. During a league game against A.O. Markopoulo, she achieved the unbelievable record of 17 serving points.

In 2017-18 season she won with the Piraeus club the CEV Women's Challenge Cup, being the 3rd top scorer with 137 points and the 3rd best server with 19 aces in the whole competition. She also won during the same season the Hellenic championship and the Hellenic cup as well, competing with the best way in the historical Continental Treble of Olympiacos Piraeus that period. In the summer of 2018 she decided to leave Europe and return home for family reasons.

Sporting achievements

Clubs

International competitions
 2018   CEV Women's Challenge Cup, with Olympiacos Piraeus

National championships
 2015/2016   Philippine Super Liga Grand Prix -  Runner-up with Petron Tri-Activ Spikers
 2016/2017  Puerto Rico Volleyball League - Champion with Criollas de Caguas 
 2017/2018  Hellenic Championship, with Olympiacos Piraeus

National trophies
 2017/2018  Hellenic Cup, with Olympiacos Piraeus

Individual

St. Henry's High School
 District Tournament MVP
 Most Outstanding Player (Kentucky)

University of Cincinnati
 2007 Freshman of the Year
 2007 Second Team All-Conference Selection
 2008 First Team All-Conference Selection
 2009 AVCA Honorable-mention All-American
 2009 AVCA First Team Northeast Region Selection
 2010 Big East Player of the Year

Azeryol Baku
 2015–16 Azerbaijan Volleyball Super League "Best Outside Hitter"

Petron Tri-Activ Spikers
 2016 Philippine Super Liga Grand Prix "1st Best Outside Spiker"
 2019 Philippine Super Liga Grand Prix "Best Scorer"
 2019 Philippine Super Liga Grand Prix "Most Valuable Player"

References

External links
 profile at CEV website at cev.eu
 profile at Cincinnati Bearcats website at gobearcats.com
 profile at bringitusa.com

American women's volleyball players
Living people
Cincinnati Bearcats women's volleyball players
Olympiacos Women's Volleyball players
1989 births
People from Kenton County, Kentucky
Wing spikers
Sportspeople from Kentucky
Expatriate volleyball players in France
Expatriate volleyball players in Azerbaijan
Expatriate volleyball players in the Philippines
Expatriate volleyball players in Greece
American expatriate sportspeople in France
American expatriate sportspeople in Azerbaijan
American expatriate sportspeople in the Philippines
American expatriate sportspeople in Greece